Bayern is the German name for Bavaria, one of the 16 states of Germany. 

Bayern may also refer to:
 Kingdom of Bavaria, a state existing from 1806 to 1918.
 Electorate of Bavaria, an independent hereditary electorate existing from 1623 to 1806.
 FC Bayern Munich, the professional football team operated by a Munich-based sports club of the same name
 Other teams operated by the FC Bayern Munich sports club:
 FC Bayern Munich II, the reserve team for the professional football team
 Bayern Munich Junior Team, the youth academy for the professional football team
 FC Bayern Munich (women), women's football
 FC Bayern Munich (basketball), men's basketball 
 Bayern (horse), a race horse, winner of the 2014 Breeders' Cup Classic
 "Bayern" (song), by Die Toten Hosen
 Bayern, a fictional kingdom and the setting for the Books of Bayern fantasy series by author Shannon Hale.

Several naval ships of Germany:
 Bayern-class battleship
 , an ironclad launched 1878
 , a battleship launched 1915
 , a destroyer
 , a frigate